A stauropegion, also spelled stavropegion (from  from σταυρός stauros "cross" and πήγνυμι pegnumi "to affirm"), is a monastery or a parish which depends directly on the primate or on the Holy Synod of a particular Church, and which is not under the jurisdiction of the local bishop. The name comes from the Byzantine tradition of summoning the Patriarch to place a cross at the foundation of stauropegic monasteries or parochial churches.

Such exempt jurisdictions, both monastic and parochial, are common in Eastern Christianity, mainly in Eastern Orthodox Churches, but also in some Eastern Catholic Churches. Their institutional counterparts in the Latin Church ecclesiastical order of the Catholic Church are various exempt jurisdictions, such as monasteries that are directly subjected to the Holy See of Rome.

Stauropegic monasteries 
A stauropegic monastery, also rendered "stavropegic", "stauropegial" or "stavropegial", is an Eastern Orthodox or Eastern Catholic Christian monastery, subordinated directly to a primate or Synod, rather than to a local Bishop.

The practice of exempting some monasteries from jurisdictions of local bishops, placing them under a direct jurisdiction of the patriarch, was present at least since the reign of Byzantine Emperor Maurice (582-602). Such exemptions became more common after the Council of Constantinople (861). In time, those practices included not only monasteries, but also various parochial churches, to the extent that authorities had to regulate the issue by imposing stricter criteria for the creation of such exemptions.

Stauropegic monasteries are distinguished from the greatest monasteries, called lavras, and from the patriarchal metochions, where the patriarch serves as a parish priest. The metochions of the Patriarch of Moscow are the Vysokopetrovsky Monastery and Nikolo-Perervinsky Monastery.

Bulgarian Orthodox Church
The Bulgarian Orthodox Church has three stauropegic monasteries:
 Rila Monastery
 Bachkovo Monastery
 Troyan Monastery

The Alexander Nevsky Cathedral and the Sofia Seminary are also directly subordinate to the Bulgarian Patriarch and Synod.

Serbian Orthodox Church

Several major Serbian Orthodox monasteries had special status in Middle Ages. Today, the Serbian Orthodox Church has two stauropegic monasteries:
 Patriarchal Monastery of Peć, ancient seat of the Serbian Patriarchate of Peć (1346-1463 and 1557-1766). The principal title of Serbian Patriarchs is still Archbishop of Peć.
Saint Sava Serbian Orthodox Monastery in Libertyville, Illinois, United States.

Russian Orthodox Church
The first stauropegic monastery in the Russian Orthodox Church was Simonov Monastery (1383). It was subordinated directly to the Ecumenical Patriarch, because it was founded by Greeks and was home to the patriarch during his visits to Moscow.

In 1561 Ivan the Terrible decreed that the following seven monasteries should precede all the rest:
Trinity Lavra, Sergiev Posad
Chudov Monastery, Moscow
Andronikov Monastery, Moscow
Kirillo-Belozersky Monastery, Kirillov
Epiphany Monastery, Moscow
Pafnutiev Monastery, Borovsk
Joseph-Volokolamsky Monastery near Volokolamsk

After the establishment of the Patriarchate in Moscow, there were no stauropegic monasteries subordinated directly to the Patriarch for some time. But Nikon founded the New Jerusalem Monastery, Valday Iversky Monastery, and Kiy Island Monastery, which he governed himself, instead of placing each under an hegumen (abbot).

The Greek custom, first introduced by Nikon, was continued by other Patriarchs and by the Holy Governing Synod. Stauropegic houses were not always the most important monasteries, the holiest, the richest, or the largest. They might have been dear to the ruling Patriarch for personal reasons. In the 19th century, apart from four lavras, seven monasteries were considered stauropegial:
 Novospassky Monastery, Moscow
 New Jerusalem Monastery, Istra
 Simonov Monastery, Moscow
 Donskoy Monastery, Moscow
 Solovetsky Monastery, Solovki
 Yakovlevsky Monastery, Rostov
 Zaikonospassky Monastery, Moscow

, the following monasteries were recognized as stauropegial by the Russian Orthodox Church:

Monasteries of Moscow:
 Danilov Monastery, Moscow
 Donskoy Monastery, Moscow
 Novospassky Monastery, Moscow
 Sretensky Monastery, Moscow
 Zachatyevsky Convent, Moscow
 Intercession Convent, Moscow
 Nativity Convent, Moscow

Monasteries of Central Russia:
 Joseph-Volokolamsky Monastery, Moscow Oblast
 New Jerusalem Monastery, Moscow Oblast
 Optina Monastery, Kaluga Oblast
 St. Savva Monastery, Moscow Oblast
 Ugreshi Monastery, Moscow Oblast
 Amvrosievsky Shamordinsky Convent, Kaluga Oblast
 Borisoglebsky Anosin Convent, Moscow Oblast
 Intercession Convent, Khotkovo, Moscow Oblast
 Krestovozdvizhensky Convent, Moscow Oblast

Monasteries of North-Western Russia:
 Solovetsky Monastery, Arkhangelsk Oblast
 Valaam Monastery, Republic of Karelia
 Vyashchizhi Monastery, Novgorod Oblast
 Ioannovsky Convent, Saint Petersburg

Monasteries outside Russia:
 Assumption Monastery, Zhirovitsy, Hrodna Oblast, Belarus
 Glinsk Hermitage, Sumy Oblast, Ukraine
 Holy Trinity Monastery, Jordanville, New York, United States
 Pühtitsa Convent, Estonia
 St. George Monastery, Horodnytsia, Zhytomyr Oblast, Ukraine
 Trinity Convent, Korets, Rivne Oblast, Ukraine
 Assumption Monastery, Zimne, Volyn Oblast, Ukraine

Ukrainian Greek Catholic Church
A stauropegial monastery (monasterium stauropegiaceum) under patriarchal jurisdiction (monasterium iuris patriarchalis) is a monastery that is subject directly to the patriarch (can. 434 Code of Canons of the Eastern Churches).

Monasteries in Ukraine:
 Univ Lavra

Stauropegic parishes 
Stauropegic parishes in Eastern Orthodoxy are exempt parishes that are not under jurisdiction of a local bishop, but are directly subjected to a higher hierarch, usually a patriarch. Such parishes are created for various reasons, symbolic or practical.

See also
 Ecclesiastical jurisdiction
 Eastern Orthodox canon law
 Exemption (Catholic Church)
 Royal Peculiar
 Patriarchal Stavropegic Monastery of St. John the Baptist (England)
 Orthodox Church in America Stavropegial Institutions

References

Sources

External links 

 

Eastern Christian monasticism
Church parishes